"Savages" is the second, and self-titled single on Theory of a Deadman's fifth studio album Savages. The single was released on September 16, 2014.

Chart positions

References

2014 singles
2014 songs
Theory of a Deadman songs
Song recordings produced by Howard Benson
Roadrunner Records singles
Songs written by Tyler Connolly